Deh Balai Kherqeh (also Romanized as Deh Bālāī Kherqeh) is a village in Ahmadabad Rural District, in the Central District of Firuzabad County, Fars Province, Iran. At the 2006 census, its population was 43, in 7 families.

References 

Populated places in Firuzabad County